The 1991–92 NCAA Division I men's basketball season began in November 1991 and ended with the Final Four at the Hubert H. Humphrey Metrodome in Minneapolis, Minnesota on April 6, 1992.

Season headlines 

 Michigan became the first program to land four McDonald's All-Americans – Chris Webber, Juwan Howard, Jalen Rose, and Jimmy King – in a single recruiting class. Joined by Ray Jackson, the group of freshmen was known as the Fab Five.
 The 1992 East Regional Final, a 104-103 Duke win over Kentucky in overtime, is considered by many to be the greatest NCAA tournament game (or college basketball game overall) of all-time.
 Duke held the #1 ranking in both polls the entire season, played in its fifth consecutive Final Four, and became the first repeat national champion since the 1972–73 UCLA Bruins.

Major rule changes 
Beginning in 1991–92, the following rules changes were implemented:

Season outlook

Pre-season polls 
The top 25 from the AP Poll and Coaches Poll during the pre-season.

Conference membership changes 

These schools joined new conferences for the 1991–92 season.

Regular season

Statistical leaders

Conference standings

Postseason tournaments

NCAA Tournament

Final Four - Hubert H. Humphrey Metrodome, Minneapolis, Minnesota 

# signifies Michigan's final two games, in the 1992 Final Four, were vacated on November 7, 2002, as part of the settlement of the University of Michigan basketball scandal. Unlike forfeiture, a vacated game does not result in the other school being credited with a win, only with the removal of any Michigan wins from all records.

National Invitation Tournament

NIT Semifinals and Final

Award winners

Consensus All-American teams

Major player of the year awards 
 Wooden Award: Christian Laettner, Duke
 Naismith Award: Christian Laettner, Duke
 Associated Press Player of the Year: Christian Laettner, Duke
 UPI Player of the Year: Jim Jackson, Ohio State
 NABC Player of the Year: Christian Laettner, Duke
 Oscar Robertson Trophy (USBWA): Christian Laettner, Duke
 Adolph Rupp Trophy: Christian Laettner, Duke
 Sporting News Player of the Year: Christian Laettner, Duke

Major coach of the year awards 
 Associated Press Coach of the Year: Roy Williams, Kansas
 UPI Coach of the Year: Perry Clark, Tulane
 Henry Iba Award (USBWA): Perry Clark, Tulane
 NABC Coach of the Year: George Raveling, USC
 Naismith College Coach of the Year: Mike Krzyzewski, Duke
 CBS/Chevrolet Coach of the Year: George Raveling, USC
 Sporting News Coach of the Year: Mike Krzyzewski, Duke

Other major awards 
 Frances Pomeroy Naismith Award (Best player under 6'0): Tony Bennett, Wisconsin-Green Bay
 Robert V. Geasey Trophy (Top player in Philadelphia Big 5): Randy Woods, La Salle
 NIT/Haggerty Award (Top player in New York City metro area): Malik Sealy, St. John's
 USBWA National Freshman of the Year: Chris Webber, Michigan

Coaching changes 

A number of teams changed coaches during the season and after it ended.

References